Mount Lebanon Governorate is one of the nine governorates of Lebanon. Its capital is Baabda.

This governorate is named after the mountainous region of Mount Lebanon and, except for the small Beirut Governorate which it surrounds, spans the stretch of the Mediterranean coast between Keserwan-Jbeil Governorate and South Governorate.

Geography 
The Governorate of Mount Lebanon (except the area around Beirut) extends along the coast of the Mediterranean Sea. It borders the Northern Governorate in the northern part and the Southern Governorate in the southern part. On the eastern side, it borders the governorates of Bekaa and Baalbek-Hermel.

The governorate's altitude ranges from zero to 3,000 meters above sea level. It has diverse geographical features, including urban areas, mixed rural areas and natural areas. It is crossed by 5 rivers (Nahr El Kalb, Nahr Beirut, Damour, Awali River and Nahr Ibrahim) and includes the Shabrouh Dam with a capacity of 8 million cubic meters of water.

Districts
The governorate is divided into four districts (singular qaḍāʼ):

The districts of Jbeil and Keserwan were part of Mount Lebanon Governorate until 7 September 2017, when they were separated to form Keserwan-Jbeil Governorate.

Demographics
Mount Lebanon has a Christian majority with the presence of other religious groups such as Muslims. Maronites live in the Metn and Baabda districts (other Christian denominations such as Greek Orthodox, Armenian Orthodox, and Greek Catholics make up the rest of the population alongside Muslims). The Druze are the majority in the Aley district and a plurality in the Chouf district (nearly equal in numbers with Sunni Muslims and Christians). Shia minorities live in the Coast areas of Baabda District like Borj Al Barajneh, Haret Hreik, Ghobeiry and Chiyah.

Economy 
The economy of Mount Lebanon Governorate depends mainly on industrial activities. The Governorate includes the highest percentage of industrial establishments in Lebanon (about 58% of the total Lebanese industrial establishments). Most of these establishments work in the food industries sector (17.93%), thus representing 34% of the total number of companies engaged in food industries. This sector is followed by paper and printing companies, which constitute 13.15% of the industrial establishments in Mount Lebanon. There are more than 12 industrial zones in Mount Lebanon, near the port of Beirut.

The Governorate of Mount Lebanon includes 5 tourist sites out of the nine most attractive sites for tourists. It also includes 260 hotels, which is the highest percentage among the governorates, with the exception of Beirut.

References

 
Governorates of Lebanon